Room for Two may refer to:

 Room for Two (film), a 1940 British comedy film
 Room for Two (American TV series), a 1992 American sitcom television series 
 Room for Two (Australian TV series), 1958–1959

See also
 "Room for 2", a 2016 song by Dua Lipa, from her debut self-titled album